Dražen Kovačević (born 1974 in Zagreb) is a popular Serbian comic-book creator, known best for his comic Wheel (Serbian: "Točak") created with Goran Skrobonja. He mainly works for major French publishers.

Comicography
 „La Roue,“ script Goran Skrobonja
 La prophétie de Korot, „Glénat“, France, 2001. Novel adaptation: Vladimir Vesović
 Les 7 combattants de Korot I, —||—, 2002
 Les 7 combattants de Korot II, —||—, 2003.
 Les 7 combattants de Korot III, —||—, 2005.

 „La Meute de l'enfer“, script Philippe Thirault 
 Les compagnons de l'aigle, „Les Humanoïdes Associés“, France, 2003.
 Le retour du harith, —||—, 2005.
 Le secret de la Sibylle, —||—, 2006.
 La tanière du mal, —||—, 2010.

 „L' Épée de Feu“, script Sylvain Cordurié 
 La malédiction de Garlath, „Soleil Productions“, France, 2009.
 La faiblesse de la chair,  —||—, 2011.

 „Walkyrie“, script Sylvain Cordurié
 Légendes nordiques, „Soleil“, France, 2012.

External links
https://web.archive.org/web/20071227204444/http://www.upps-sajt.com/index.php?option=com_content&task=view&id=488&Itemid=2
 Dražen Kovačević biography, Bedetheque.com (French)

1974 births
Living people
Serbian comics artists